The Soviet locomotive class FD was a Soviet main freight steam locomotive type named after Felix Dzerzhinsky. Between 1932 and 1942, 3213 FD series locomotives were built.

History 
The locomotive was created in connection with the industrialization conducted in the USSR. Planning took only 100 days, and typical construction time was 170 days. For certain features the design engineers referred to American practice in steam locomotive design. The first locomotive was built at the October Revolution Locomotive Factory in Luhansk, Ukrainian SSR (Luhansk, Ukraine) in 1931 and sent for a show to Moscow.

Tests, in which the locomotive performed well, were conducted in 1932. In that year the Luhansk October Revolution plant began mass production of FD20 locomotives. Over the course of production their construction got better steadily. From the beginning of the Great Patriotic war in 1941, production was interrupted only in 1942; four locomotives were built in Ulan-Ude, Russian SFSR. Total production was 2927 locomotives of FD20 and 286 locomotives of FD21. The two subclasses only differed in the type of superheater.

The locomotives of FD operated in areas with high turnover of goods. They worked on 23 of 43 railways in the USSR, including in Siberia and in the Urals. From middle of 1950, in connection with conversion to diesel engines and electric locomotives, the locomotives of FD began to be pushed aside from work. Also in 1958–1960 about 1000 locomotives were transferred to China, as China Railway class FD; some of these were subsequently transferred from China to North Korea, where the Korean State Railway numbered them in the 8500 series.

Gallery

See also
 Russian Railway Museum, St.Petersburg
 The Museum of the Moscow Railway, at Paveletsky Rail Terminal, Moscow
 Rizhsky Rail Terminal, Home of the Moscow Railway Museum
 Finland Station, St.Petersburg
 History of rail transport in Russia

References

Notes

Literature
 В.А. Раков. Локомотивы отечественных железных дорог 1845-1955. — 2-е, переработанное и дополненное. — Москва: «Транспорт», 1995
 Справочник по локомотивам железных дорог СССР. Главное управление локомотивного хозяйства МПС. Трансжелдориздат 1956
 Курс паровозов. Устройство и работа паровозов и техника их ремонта (под редакцией С.П. Сыромятникова), Трансжелдориздат (State Publishing House), 1937

External links

 
 

FD
2-10-2 locomotives
Luhanskteplovoz locomotives
Freight locomotives
5 ft gauge locomotives
Standard gauge locomotives of China
Railway locomotives introduced in 1931
Locomotives of North Korea